Blas García Ravelo   was a Spanish sculptor of the 17th century from Tenerife. A pupil of Martín de Andújar Cantos, he is considered one of the island's most noted sculptors.

References

Spanish sculptors
Spanish male sculptors
People from Tenerife